The 1975 European Athletics Junior Championships was the third edition of the biennial athletics competition for European athletes aged under twenty. It was held in Athens, Greece.

Men's results

Women's results

Medal table

References

Results
European Junior Championships 1975. World Junior Athletics History. Retrieved on 2013-05-29.

European Athletics U20 Championships
European Junior
Sports competitions in Athens
International athletics competitions hosted by Greece
1975 in Greek sport
1975 in youth sport
Athletics in Athens